William Lloyd Tanous (born in Paris, France) is a Lebanese-American music industry executive. In 2013, he was appointed Executive Vice President Head of Global Communications for Universal Music Group, the world's largest music company.

In 2021, Tanous was promoted to Executive Vice President Chief Administrative Officer for Universal Music Group.

Career

1993-2013
Tanous was previously a member of the senior management team for Warner Music Group, where he was EVP of Communications & Marketing. While at WMG, Tanous developed and implemented communications strategies for major company endeavors, including the 2011 sale of WMG for $3.3 billion to Access Industries, Inc.; WMG's initial public offering on the New York Stock Exchange in 2005; and the sale of WMG for $2.6 billion by Time Warner Inc. to private equity consortium. In 1996, he co-created and produced the HBO live music television series Reverb, which aired for four seasons and was the highest-rated regularly scheduled music program on television. Prior to joining Warner Music Group, Tanous held positions at Warner Music International and Geffen Records. He also served as president of two independent record labels.

2013-Present
Tanous became the EVP of Communications at Universal Music Group in April 2013, reporting to Universal Music Group Chairman and CEO Lucian Grainge. Grainge referred to Tanous as "widely recognized for having been a trusted strategic advisor to many CEOs in the media industry. He has a deep understanding of the opportunities and challenges related to the intersection of entertainment and technology, and as such, joins UMG at an important time in the evolution of our company." Tanous is responsible for developing and communicating the company's business strategy, managing worldwide communications, public policy, government relations, as well as interaction of UMG's companies in over 60 countries.

He is based in Santa Monica, California, at the company's headquarters. In 2019, Tanous was awarded the Ellis Island Medal of Honor, which is presented annually to US citizens "who have distinguished themselves within their own ethnic groups while exemplifying the values of the American way of life."

Personal life
Tanous graduated from Georgetown University in Washington, D.C. and holds a Bachelor of Arts degree.

References

Living people
American music industry executives
American people of Lebanese descent
Georgetown University alumni
Year of birth missing (living people)